Linda Deliah Thompson (born 1960) is an American politician and former mayor of Harrisburg, Pennsylvania serving from January 4, 2010, until January 6, 2014. Thompson was Harrisburg's first female and first black mayor. In 2016 Thompson established LDT Ministries.

Early life 
Born and raised in Harrisburg, Thompson graduated from Harrisburg High School in 1979. She went on to attend Howard University in Washington, DC where she received a B.S. in Communications. While in Washington, Thompson interned at the United States Department of Justice.

Political career 
In 2001, Thompson was elected to serve on the Harrisburg City Council. She was re-elected and appointed President of City Council in 2005. While on council, Thompson introduced legislation to sell off city-owned Western artifacts in order to raise money to pay down debts. She also amended the 2009 budget to include $100,000 to pay for a citywide bulk trash pickup.

Thompson decided not to run for re-election in 2009 and instead ran for the Democratic nomination for Mayor. In the May primary, Thompson beat former mayor Stephen R. Reed by nearly 1,000 votes to win the election. Despite her upset win in the Democratic primary, Thompson went on to win the general election by only about 800 votes against Republican challenger Nevin Mindlin. Failure to reach an agreement on how to assign the budget and what should or should not be included, as well as an Act 47 proposal by the state turned down by the City Council, led to a fiscal emergency she attempted to resolve.

In the primaries for the 2013 Harrisburg mayoral election Thompson was defeated for re-nomination as mayor by Harrisburg businessman Eric R. Papenfuse, who won the primary, and City Controller Dan Miller, who placed second.

Thompson was the Democratic nominee for the 4th Congressional District of Pennsylvania in 2014. She was defeated by incumbent Republican Scott Perry.

Controversies 

In late March 2013 Mayor Thompson was discussing the privatization of city waste collection, she stated, "We're not opening up our flood gates for some scumbag that comes from Perry County who … comes here and wants to dump for free." The comment brought about a firestorm of backlash.

See also 
 List of mayors of Harrisburg
 Harrisburg City Council

References

External links 
 LDT Ministries
 Biography

1960 births
Living people
Mayors of Harrisburg, Pennsylvania
Harrisburg City Council members
African-American mayors in Pennsylvania
Women mayors of places in Pennsylvania
Pennsylvania Democrats
Women city councillors in Pennsylvania
African-American city council members in Pennsylvania
21st-century African-American people
21st-century African-American women
20th-century African-American people
20th-century African-American women
African-American women mayors